The 1946 Idaho Vandals football team represented the University of Idaho in the 1946 college football season. The Vandals were led by second-year head coach James A. Brown and were members of the Pacific Coast Conference. Home games were played on campus at Neale Stadium in Moscow, with none held in Boise this season.

Idaho was  overall and lost all five of their PCC games.

The Vandals' losing streak in the Battle of the Palouse with neighbor Washington State reached eighteen games, shut out  in Pullman on October 5. Idaho tied the Cougars four years later, but the winless streak continued 

In the rivalry game with Montana in Missoula, Idaho was blanked  to relinquish the Little Brown Stein; it was the fourth of six straight shutouts in the series, with each side winning three.

Shortly after the final game on Thanksgiving, Brown resigned as head coach; succeeded by Dixie Howell in

Schedule

 One game was played on Thursday (at Fresno on Thanksgiving)

All-conference
No Vandals were named to the All-Coast team.

References

External links
Gem of the Mountains: 1947 University of Idaho yearbook – 1946 football season
Go Mighty Vandals – 1946 football season
Official game program: Idaho at Washington State –  October 5, 1946
WSU Libraries: Game video – Idaho at Washington State – October 5, 1946
Idaho Argonaut – student newspaper – 1946 editions

Idaho
Idaho Vandals football seasons
Idaho Vandals football